This is a complete list of members of the United States Senate during the 111th United States Congress listed by seniority, from January 3, 2009, to January 3, 2011. It is a historical listing and contains people who had not served the entire two-year Congress, such as Joe Biden and Hillary Clinton.

Order of service is based on the commencement of the senator's first term. Following this is former service as a U.S. senator (only giving the senator seniority within his or her new incoming class), service as Vice President of the United States, a U.S. Representative, a cabinet secretary, a state governor. Others are separated by his or her state's population.

Senators who were sworn in during the middle of the two-year Congress (up until the last senator who was not sworn in early after winning the November 2010 election) are listed at the end of the list with no number. However, Roland Burris and Al Franken are listed as numbers 99 and 100. Burris was appointed at the end of the previous Congress, but was blocked from taking his seat until January 12, 2009, and Franken won the United States Senate election in Minnesota, 2008, but was unable to take his seat until July 7, 2009 due to an election contest.

John Kerry was the most senior junior senator from the opening of the 111th Congress until the death of Ted Kennedy in August 2009, whereupon Tom Harkin took on the distinction. Amy Klobuchar was the most junior senior senator in the first eighteen days of the Congress until Mark Udall, a freshman, became Colorado's senior senator upon Ken Salazar's resignation in late January 2009 to become Interior Secretary.

Terms of service

U.S. Senate seniority list

See also
111th United States Congress
List of members of the United States House of Representatives in the 111th Congress by seniority

Notes

External links

111
Senate Seniority